François Prelati was an Italian priest and alchemist who took part in the murders committed by Gilles de Rais in the 15th century. He claimed he could summon demons and involved Gilles in this practice.

He is thought by some to have been a possible sexual partner of Gilles but "in absence of evidence",  this is only a speculation initially stated by Georges Bataille.

In fiction
François Prelati has appeared as a character in stories such as Thief of Souls by Ann Benson and Fate/strange fake by Ryōgo Narita., as well as a character referencing him in the anime Senki Zesshou Symphogear AXZ and Fate/Zero.

References

Italian alchemists
15th-century alchemists
15th-century Italian Roman Catholic priests
Year of birth unknown
Year of death unknown
Italian murderers